Couillet may refer to:
 Couillet (locomotive builder)
 Couillet, Belgium